The Story of a Crime (translit. Istoriya odnogo prestupleniya) is a 1962 Soviet animated Short film directed by Fyodor Khitruk and based on a screenplay by Michael Volpin. It was produced by Soyuzmultfilm.

It was the first film by Khitruk, whose role in the history of Russian animation led him to be recognized as a People's Artist of the USSR and a Meritorious Artist, and to receive the Order of the Red Banner of Labour and the Order "For Merit to the Fatherland". The film is a hybrid of Traditional animation and Cutout animation

Plot summary 
Noises at night made by rude neighbors cause the very friendly and peaceful Vasily Mamin to commit a crime. The cartoon serves as an explanation as of why such a brutal crime is committed at the beginning. It is a flashback at how Mamin spent his last 24 hours before the crime. The character is having a drastic change in his life, but if we think about on our self, is it wrong?

Voice cast 
 Zinovy Gerdt as Narrator

Awards 
 9th International Short Film Festival in Oberkhauzen (Federal Republic of Germany), 1963
 Diploma and The Golden Gates Prize of the 7th International Cinema Festival in San Francisco, 1962

External links 

The Story of a Crime at animator.ru
Dazzling animations at Tampere Film Festival web page
 The Spirit Of Genius: Feodor Khitruk by William Moritz
Konstantin Bronzit, Alesha Popovich and Tugarin the Serpent (Alesha Popovich i Tugarin Zmei) (2004) at Kinokultura.com

1962 animated films
1962 films
Soviet animated short films
Soyuzmultfilm
Films directed by Fyodor Khitruk